Hamaneh may refer to:
 Hamaneh, Ardakan
 Hamaneh, Saduq